Talgarth Town Football Club is a Welsh football team based in Talgarth, Powys, Wales.  The team currently play in the Central Wales League Southern Division, which is at the fourth tier of the Welsh football league system.

History
Talgarth Town was founded in 1969 as a successor team to Talgarth FC which had disbanded seven years earlier. The 1971–72 season is regarded as the team's most successful season where they were league champions and winners in seven cup finals.

Honours

Talgarth FC
Mid Wales League (South) – Champions: 1987–88
Radnorshire Cup – Winners: 1988–89
Mid Wales League Cup – Runners-up: 1990–91
Welsh National League (Central Wales) First Division – Runners-up: 1926–27

Talgarth Town
Mid Wales League (South) – Champions: 2018–19
Radnorshire Cup – Runners-up: 2013–14
Brecon & District League – Champions: 1971–72 (unbeaten)
Brecon & District League – Runners-up: 1970–71
Brecon and District League Cup – Winners: 1971–72
Talgarth R.A.F.A. Cup – Winners: 1969–70, 1970–71, 1971–72
Glasbury Challenge Cup – Winners: 1971–72
Glasbury Challenge Cup – Runners-up: 1970–71
Hay Cup – Winners: 1971–72
Boughrood Cup – Winners: 1971–72
John Hando Cup – Winners: 1971–72
Alfred Sparey Cup, Presteigne – Winners: 1971–72

References

Mid Wales Football League clubs
Football clubs in Wales
Sport in Powys
Mid Wales South League clubs
Association football clubs established in 1969
1969 establishments in Wales